The Ribe skull fragment (DR EM85;151B in Rundata, also known as DK SJy39) is a section of human skull bone inscribed with runes and unearthed in 1973 in an archaeological excavation at Ribe, Denmark. It dates to circa 725 CE.

Description

The skull fragment is approximately 6 x 8.5 cm in size and has been taken from the top of a cranium. It has a hole bored in it and it is inscribed with transitional Younger Futhark runes. The runic inscription retains two character shapes from the Elder Futhark, ᚺ and ᛗ.

 ᚢᛚᚠᚢᛦᛡᚢᚴᚢᚦᛁᚾᛡᚢᚴᚺᚢᛏᛁᚢᛦ ¶ ᚺᛁᛡᛚᛒᛒᚢᚱᛁᛁᛋᚢᛁᚦᛦ ¶ ᚦᛡᛁᛗᛡᚢᛁᛡᚱᚴᛁᛡᚢᚴᛏᚢᛁᚱᚴᚢᚾᛁᚾ ¶ ᛒᚢᚢᚱ
These transliterate as:
 ulfuʀukuþinukutiuʀ ¶ ilbburiisuiþʀ ¶ þiuirkiuktuirkunin ¶ buur

Interpretation

A possible interpretation of the inscription is:
 Ulfr auk Ōðinn auk Hō-tiur. Hjalp buri es viðr þæima værki. Auk dverg unninn. Bōurr.
 Ulfr and Odin and High-tiur. buri is help against this pain. And the dwarf (is) overcome. Bóurr.

Where "Ulfr" may refer to the wolf Fenrir, "Odin" to the god Odin, and "High-tiur" to the god Týr, buri would then refer to the god Búri, but one should note that the runic buri can also be read as "hole", or as the dative of a name Burr, in which case the meaning would be "It serves as help for Buri against the pain".

It has been suggested that the existence of a hole in the fragment may indicate its use as an amulet, however, there is a general lack of wear of the type that would be expected if it had been used in this way.

See also
 Against a Dwarf
 Canterbury charm
 Kvinneby amulet
 Near Fakenham plaque
 Ribe healing-stick
 Sigtuna amulet I

References

Runic inscriptions
Historical runic magic
Archaeological discoveries in Denmark